Hopkins Public Schools can refer to:

 Hopkins Public Schools (Michigan)
 Hopkins Public Schools (Minnesota)